Agustín Velotti (born May 24, 1992) is an Argentine tennis player.

Velotti won the 2010 French Open Boys' singles competition after beating his good friend Andrea Collarini, 6–4, 7–5.

Previously, he had won different junior tournaments, including B16 of Buenos Aires in 2007, in 2008 the tournaments B18 G5 in Londrina, Argentina, B18 G5 in Montevideo, Uruguay, B16 Mondial Paris Cadets Trophee Lagardere in Paris, B16 Torneo Dell Avenire in Milan, B16 of Montecatini, B16 at the Copa Argentina de San Miguel, the B16 Copa Indervalle in Cali, and in 2009 the B18 Astrid Bowl in Loverval, Belgium.

, he was ranked no. 2 in the ITF Junior Rankings.

Futures and Challenger Career Finals

Singles: 21 (16–5)

Doubles: 18 (11-7)

Junior Grand Slam Finals

Boys' Singles (1 title)

Boys' Doubles (1 runner-up)

Notes

References

External links

1992 births
Living people
People from Corrientes
Argentine people of Italian descent
Argentine male tennis players
French Open junior champions
South American Games silver medalists for Argentina
South American Games medalists in tennis
Competitors at the 2010 South American Games
Grand Slam (tennis) champions in boys' singles
Sportspeople from Corrientes Province